This is a list of seasons completed by the Chicago Maroons football team of the National Collegiate Athletic Association (NCAA) Division III and have been a football-only member of the Midwest Conference since 2017. The University of Chicago was a founding member of the Big Ten Conference and the Maroons were coached by Amos Alonzo Stagg for 41 seasons. In the late 1930s, university president Robert Maynard Hutchins decided that big-time college football and the university's commitment to academics were not compatible. The University of Chicago abolished its football program in 1939 and withdrew from the Big Ten in 1946. Football returned to the University of Chicago in 1963 in the form of a club team, which was upgraded to varsity status in 1969. The Maroons began competing in Division III in 1973.

Seasons

See also
List of Big Ten Conference football standings (1896–1958)

References

Chicago

Chicago Maroons football seasons